Angel Square (also known as The Comic Book Christmas Caper) is a 1990 Canadian film directed by Anne Wheeler and starring Ned Beatty and Nicola Cavendish. The film is based on the novel of the same title by Brian Doyle.

Premise
In 1945, a boy investigates after his friend's father has his sense of security violated when he is brutally beaten by a unknown attacker while working.

Cast

Awards
In 1991 it won 3 Genie Awards:
 George Blondheim & Anne Wheeler for Best Original Song
 Garrell Clark & Paul A. Sharpe for Best Overall Sound
 Alison Grace, Gael MacLean, Anne Bakker, Debra Rurak, & Cal Shumiatcher for Best Adapted Screenplay

References

External links

NFB collections page

1990 films
English-language Canadian films
1990s English-language films
Films based on Canadian novels
Films directed by Anne Wheeler
Films set in 1945
Films set in Canada
Films shot in Edmonton
National Film Board of Canada films
Canadian drama films
1990s Canadian films